FSS may refer to:

Education 
 Faculty of Social Sciences, Charles University in Prague in the Czech Republic
 Fernie Secondary School, in British Columbia, Canada
 Friends Select School, in Philadelphia, Pennsylvania, United States
 Frontenac Secondary School, in Kingston, Ontario, Canada

Government 
 Federal Security Service (Russia)
 Federal Supply Service, part of the United States General Services Administration
 Financial Supervisory Service (South Korea)
 Food Standards Scotland
 Forensic and Scientific Services, an agency of the state government of Queensland, Australia
 Forensic Science Service, a defunct British crown corporation
 Foreign Service Specialist, Department of State

Military 
 Fast Sealift Ship of the United States Navy
 Fire Support Specialist, an artillery observer in the United States Army
 RAF Kinloss, a former Royal Air Force station in Scotland

Sport 
 Florida State Seminoles, the sports teams of Florida State University
 Football Association of Serbia
 FS Seoul, a South Korean futsal club

Technology 
 Fish School Search
 Fixed-satellite service
 Fixed Service Structure, a launch tower leased by SpaceX at Kennedy Space Center, Florida, United States
 Flats Sequencing System, a mail sorting system used by the United States Postal Service
 Flight service station
 Flying-spot scanner
 Food Service Solutions, an American software company
 Frequency selective surface

Other uses 
 FSS (brand), a Colombian sports apparel manufacturer
 Federal Signal Corporation, an American emergency services equipment manufacturer
 Fellow of the Royal Statistical Society
 Finland-Swedish Sign Language
 The Five Star Stories, a manga series by Mamoru Nagano
 Flinders Street railway station in Melbourne, Australia
 Foundation Stock Service Program, a dog breed registry
 Fox Sports South, an American regional sports network by Fox Sports Networks
 Freeman–Sheldon syndrome
 FSS Code, an international maritime fire code
 Standard Written Form, a Cornish orthographic standard
 Swiss Socialist Federation, a defunct political party in Switzerland

See also 
 FS (disambiguation)